Joe Bailon (March 18, 1923 – September 25, 2017) was an American car customizer credited with creating the paint color Candy Apple Red, which eventually led to a full spectrum of candy paint colors, each with a metallic base-coat, a transparent color coat, and a final clear coat.

Bailon customized such cars as Zsa Zsa Gabor's Rolls-Royce, Danny Thomas' Continental, Dean Martin's Cadillac station wagon, and Sammy Davis, Jr.'s, Chevrolet Vega wagon.  Joe built the Oldsmobile Toronado-powered Panthermobile. He was an inductee of the National Rod & Custom Museum Hall of Fame.

The San Francisco Rod, Custom and Motorcycle Show annually gives the Joe Bailon Elegance Award for the visual appearance of the paint, interior, engine, design, and suspension. The trophy, unique for the award, features a Candy Apple Red apple, painted by Bailon.

Bailon, who grew up in Newcastle, California, as the youngest of ten children, later worked in the Richmond Shipyards prior to fighting in World War II, and thereafter turned to customizing cars.  He lived in Auburn, California until his death on September 25, 2017 at the age of 94.

References 

Lackey, Mike. "Joe Bailon."  Lima Daily News, 18 September, 2005.

External links 
Pink Panther car images from Google
Learn More About Candy Paints

1923 births
2017 deaths
American industrial designers
People from Auburn, California
People from Newcastle, California
Military personnel from California
Vehicle modification people
American military personnel of World War II